Parshevitsa is a ski resort in the Balkan Mountains of Bulgaria.

References
Bulgariaski.com

Balkan mountains
Ski areas and resorts in Bulgaria